The 1969 French Open was a tennis tournament that was held at the Stade Roland Garros in Paris in France from May 26 through June 8, 1969. It was the 73rd edition of the French Open, the 39th to be open to foreign competitors, and the second Grand Slam of the year. Rod Laver won his second Grand Slam title of the year.

Finals

Men's singles

 Rod Laver defeated  Ken Rosewall, 6–4, 6–3, 6–4

Women's singles

 Margaret Court defeated  Ann Haydon-Jones, 6–1, 4–6, 6–3

Men's doubles

 John Newcombe /  Tony Roche defeated  Roy Emerson /  Rod Laver, 4–6, 6–1, 3–6, 6–4, 6–4

Women's doubles

 Françoise Dürr /  Ann Haydon-Jones defeated  Margaret Court /  Nancy Richey, 6–0, 4–6, 7–5

Mixed doubles

 Margaret Court /  Marty Riessen defeated  Françoise Dürr /  Jean-Claude Barclay, 6–3, 6–2

References

External links
 French Open Official website

 
1969 in French tennis
1969 in Paris